White City Greyhounds was the greyhound racing operation held at White City Stadium in London. The venue was regarded as the sport's primary track during its existence.

History

Origins

After the 1908 Summer Olympics the White City area was used for further exhibitions, including the France-Britain Exhibition of 1908 and the Japan-Britain Exhibition of 1910, but the stadium began to be underused. By 1922 attempts had been made to sell it and it is reputed to have been in a very poor state by 1926. During the Februarys of 1926 and 1927 the stadium was used for the British Industries Fair before the public announcement that the Greyhound Racing Association (GRA) had purchased the stadium following on from the success experienced by the company at the nation's first greyhound meetings in Manchester at Belle Vue Stadium.

It would be the GRA's second stadium and the old running and cycle tracks were grassed over. A new restaurant was built and covered terracing was constructed. The Metropolitan Railway reopened their Wood Lane station in preparation for the race nights.

Opening
The first greyhounds moved into the kennels on 20 May and the first private trial was planned for 30 May with racing starting on 1 June but delays ensued. The first meeting finally took place on Monday 20 June 1927 with the first race won by a greyhound called Charlie Cranston. Entry Badge, the 1927 English Greyhound Derby winner, also ran on the opening night. There was a capacity of 93,000 and club house accommodation for 1,000 people more than the original seating capacity in 1908.

The track had a large 498 yards circumference with long straights of 120 yards described as good sweeping turns suitable for strong galloping type dogs. The hare system was an outside trolley type and the GRA’s finances were helped with the use of an automatic totalisator.

1928-1939
The GRA moved its headquarters to White City from Belle Vue and early visitors included the Prince of Wales later King Edward VIII and Prince George, later King George VI.

The English Greyhound Derby was inaugurated in 1927 followed by the Champion Hurdle (renamed the Grand National) the following year. The Oaks (for bitches only) would complete a trio of classic races. The GRA purchased the Hook estate at Northaw some 13 miles from the centre of London. They saw it as the ideal place for GRA trainers to train greyhounds for White City and Harringay Stadium which was their third track to open, and later other London tracks. The 140 acres of park and grassland became famous within the industry.

The Derby competition became the primary target for all greyhound connections. The first winner was Entry Badge who picked up 1,000, he was trained by local trainer Joe Harmon and had won a race on opening night. The following year all qualifying rounds would be held at White City which had not been the case in 1927.

In 1929 Mick the Miller arrived for his first Derby from Ireland and captured the public’s imagination sending greyhound racing into most households in Britain and Ireland. His successful defence of the title one year later drew a 50,000 crowd and the controversial final of 1931 attracted 70,000. Major Percy Brown was installed as Racing Manager (RM) in 1931 arriving from sister track Belle Vue and greyhounds that won the Derby over the following years found fame.

In 1936 the stadium introduced the Wood Lane Stakes and the 'White City', the former would remain an important race throughout the years but the latter was less known despite rewards that came second only to the Derby in terms of prize money. It was an invitation race for the sports top greyhounds but only lasted until the start of the war. In 1937 the Springbok and GRA Stakes was inaugurated for novice hurdlers and stayers respectively. Early track trainers included Leslie Reynolds, William Dixon, Albert Jonas, Les Parry and Harry Buck. A greyhound called Brave Don was the first to be transported to Britain from Ireland by air. He came into the kennels of Leslie Reynolds following a flight from Dublin to Croydon.

In 1938 the track boasted that they had the largest totalisator in the world with 634 issuing machines.

A record 92,000 people attended the 1939 English Greyhound Derby and the tote turnover set new records of £14,341 for a single race and £114,780 for a meeting. Using historic inflation (2019) this equates to £7.5 million for one meeting.

1946-1950
White City was the first track to install a photo finish camera in 1945 and the sport remained a national pastime after the war with the annual tote turnover for White City in 1946 being £17,576,190 (2015 equivalent £661 million).

In 1946 Bahs Choice went undefeated through the Wood Lane Stakes and on 6 June 1946 in a Derby trial, he recorded 28.99 sec to become the first dog in the world to break 29sec over 525 yards. Quare Times broke the track record twice during the 1946 event which led to Major Brown organising a match race between the pair at White City on August Bank Holiday Monday. Quare Times won the race setting a new world record for the 550 yards. Also in 1946 another new event was introduced called the Longcross Cup.

In 1949, three new sea-food bars attract more than 4,000 customers on race nights and the track employs 14 part time staff to cope with the demand.

1950s
White City was featured in numerous films including the 1950 movie The Blue Lamp and one year later Major Percy Brown had to select 48 greyhounds for the Derby from a record 140 entries.

In December 1955 Spanish Battleship travelled to England for the first time for a special match race with Duet leader and Hi There at White City. Pigalle Wonder and Mile Bush Pride won the Derby during the 1950s and the Gimcrack (later called The Challenge) race was introduced in 1959 with the Oaks moving to sister track Harringay.

1960s
In 1964 trainer Randolph Singleton was transferred to White City from Belle Vue and the GRA extended its board by adding Major Percy Brown, John Cearns (son of W.J Cearns) and Charles Chandler Jr. to the directors. Arthur Aldridge former RM of Powderhall Stadium and Belle Vue was brought in as the new White City RM. Camira Flash owned by the Duke of Edinburgh won the Derby for White City for only the third time.

A story broke in 1969 that the GRA had granted an option to Stock Conversion and Investment Ltd to purchase greyhound racing’s premier track White City for redevelopment. The official line was that a new modern White City stadium would be built in the remaining four acres from the existing sixteen. A greyhound reporter called Neil Martin stated this move must spell death to all sport there in time – and in my opinion greyhound racing too Fellow reporter John Bower had a different view that it would create a wonderful new stadium, a view seemingly given substance by GRA
announcing that the architects plans were already drawn up. The future of the stadium was unknown.

1970s
Patricias Hope won his second Derby and Sherrys Prince won his third consecutive Grand National victory in 1972, an added bonus for White City was the fact that his trainer Colin West had recently joined the track. West and the Cambridgeshire competition had transferred from the recently closed West Ham Stadium. In 1972 GRA Director of racing Major Percy Brown retired after 40 years in the sport, his replacement was the Arthur Aldridge. In 1975 the track switched to metres under the supervision of RM Bob Rowe.

1981-1984
During 1982 Bob Rowe relinquished his position to take up the role of chief racing manager of the GRA with John Collins brought in as the new RM. Also in 1982 trainer Joe Pickering (who joined the track in 1956) retired as did Colin West leaving White City two trainers short. They appointed Graham Mann and Frank Melville. Randy Singleton retired soon after.

Closure
The 1969 option to sell to Stock Conversion and Investment Ltd for redevelopment had almost been forgotten due to the fact that racing had continued for another 15 years but in 1984 the redevelopment plans went ahead without plans to build a new stadium. The final Derby took place in late June before the final meeting on 22 September 1984. Hastings Girl trained by Tommy Foster was the last winner and before the month had passed demolition teams had demolished the historic stadium.

The GRA, the company who introduced greyhound racing to Britain had sold the sports premier track which became a collection of BBC buildings.

Competitions

English Greyhound Derby

The stadium had four home trained Derby winners, Entry Badge (1927), Wild Woolley (1932), Greta Ranee (1935) and Camira Flash (1968).

The Oaks

Grand National

Derby Invitation/Consolation

The Cambridgeshire

Longcross Cup
The Longcross Cup was a competition held from 1946 until the stadium closed. 

1946-1970 (550 yards), 1971-1974 (725 yards), 1977-1984 (680 metres)

Wood Lane Stakes
The Wood Lane Stakes was a competition held from 1936 until the stadium closed.

1936-1975 (525 yards), 1976-1984 (500 metres)

The White City

1936 (550 yards), 1937 (500 yards), 1937 (525 yards)

G.R.A Stakes
The G.R.A (Greyhound Racing Association) Stakes was a competition held from 1937 until the stadium closed. 

1937-50 (725 yards), 1938 & 1940-45 (not held), 1952-60 & 1973-1975 (800 yards), 1961-72 (880 yards) 1976-1982 (730 metres)

Gimcrack/Challenge
The Gimcrack was renamed The Challenge in 1967 and was a competition held from 1959 until 1972.

1959-72 (525 yards)

Track records

Pre-metric

Post-metric

References

Greyhound racing in the United Kingdom
Greyhound racing in London